__notoc__

Živa, Zhiva is a mother goddess of one of the tribes belonging to the Obodritic confederation of the Polabian Slavs. The goddess so appears only in the Chronicle of Helmold of Bozov. He described the strengthening of the pagan cult during the reign of Niklot:

As the tribe's main gord was Ratzeburg, Živa, in one copy of the Chronicle, is called "Goddess of Ratzeburg".

In copies of the Chronicle, the name is noted as:  (Copenhagen copy),  (Lübeck),  (Vienna),  (Szczecin). The Copenhagen, Lübeck and Szczecin manuscripts indicate that the name contained the grapheme ⟨w⟩ ([v]); the Szczecin notation was created as a result of frequent ⟨u⟩ → ⟨n⟩ alternation and reflected the form *Syuua, while the double ⟨u⟩ = ⟨w⟩, which indicates the original form  (*Syva). The Viennese transcript is the most distorted in relation to the original.

Scholars agree on the etymology of this theonym. Originally, therefore, this theonym was a given name, which then became an epithet of an unknown goddess, whose characteristics would have to be related to the meaning of the name; this theonym can be understood as a wishing name, e.g., "may she be alive and live long", or a characterizing name, e.g., "she who is alive". Vyacheslav Ivanov i Vladimir Toporov considered Živa to be an epithet of the goddess Mokosh (which was preserved in the names of the Polabians after Christianization).

See also 
140 Siwa

References

Works cited

External links 

Mother goddesses
Slavic goddesses